Martha Frick Sanger ( Symington; born 1941) is an American writer and the great-granddaughter of Henry Clay Frick.

Works

 Helen Clay Frick:  Bittersweet Heiress, biography (Pittsburgh: University of Pittsburgh Press, 2007)
 The Henry Clay Frick Houses: Architecture-Interiors-Landscapes In the Golden Era, nonfiction (New York: Monacelli Press, 2001)
 Henry Clay Frick: An Intimate Portrait, biography (New York: Abbeville Press, 1998)

External links
 http://frickhistory.com/ Martha Frick Symington Sanger website

1941 births
Living people
21st-century American women writers
20th-century American women writers
20th-century American non-fiction writers
American biographers
American women biographers
21st-century American non-fiction writers